Vertu (stylised VERTU) is a British-based manufacturer and retailer of luxury handmade mobile phones, established in 1998 and formerly owned by Finnish mobile phone manufacturer Nokia.

Concept
According to The Economist, the concept was to market phones explicitly as fashion accessories, with the idea "if you can spend $20,000 on a watch, why not on a mobile phone?" Vertu is the brainchild of the Italian Frank Nuovo, former chief designer at Nokia. He proposed and presented the luxury concept to Nokia's board, who eventually accepted it in late 1998. At the time Nokia released their first luxury phone, the 8850. The resulting products called "Vertu" were finally announced in Paris in 2002, and part of a separate subsidiary called Vertu owned by Nokia.

Vertu phones have been described as "tasteless trash" by Wired magazine, and "technologically modest" by the Financial Times. They are often described as bling.

Collection
Vertu was launched on 21 January 2002 and the first collection available later that year. The flagship model "Signature" was launched in 2003. Its key pad contains nearly 5 carats of ruby bearings. Other models include Ascent (2004), Constellation Classic (2006), Constellation Ayxta (2009), among others. Ascent phones are designed to be lightweight and durable, made of aluminium or titanium with vulcanised rubber and leather. The Classics are simple and small handsets. Ayxtas are flip phones that come in numerous variants and colours. In 2006, Vertu produced and released the Aerius Bluetooth Headset designed by Jacob Jensen Design.

The Constellation Quest is the first smartphone by Vertu, equipped with a full QWERTY keyboard made from sapphire sculpted keys. Announced in October 2010, it is similarly styled to the Nokia E72 and runs the Symbian S60 operating system. It was priced from £5,000 (stainless steel and leather) to £17,300 (yellow gold). This was followed by Constellation in October 2011, the company's first touchscreen model. In February 2013, the Vertu Ti was the first Vertu handset after Nokia's sale, and uses the Android mobile operating system instead of Symbian. This was followed in June 2014, by Signature Touch. The Signature Touch's price ranged from $10,300/€7,900 for the base model to over $50,000/€44,000 for the Pure Jet Red Gold.

Vertu also made limited edition handsets in collaboration with Ferrari and Bentley.

The 2017 version of the Vertu Constellation was the last Vertu handset released before the company went bankrupt in 2017. 

In 2018, Vertu emerged from bankruptcy and introduced the Aster P smartphone in October at an event in Beijing.

History 
Vertu phones were made in its factories in Church Crookham, Hampshire, England. Handsets were sold through an emphasis on craftsmanship, style and service, rather than mobile phone functions. The business was based in the United Kingdom with offices in New York City, Dubai, Moscow, Frankfurt, Hong Kong, Paris and Singapore. 

In October 2012, Nokia sold Vertu to private equity group EQT VI for an unspecified amount, but retained a 10% share. By the end of 2013, the company had around 350,000 customers, and phones were on sale in 500 retail outlets, including 70 run by the company. In 2015, it was announced that EQT had sold its share of Vertu to Godin Holdings, a Hong Kong-based holding company. In November 2015, Massimiliano Pogliani was replaced by Billy Crotty as Vertu's CEO, who in turn was replaced by Gordon Watson three months later.

In March 2017 Godin Holdings sold the company to Baferton Ltd. a Cyprus-based Turkish company. In July 2017, the new shareholders applied to a court for bankruptcy protection, the company went into voluntary liquidation after plans to save it failed and Vertu Corporation Ltd was put into liquidation, leaving its residual staff of 200 unpaid and unemployed. Vertu AK France is the parent company of Vertu Corporation, through which the Vertu brand and company continues its business today.

In May 2020, the factory and office complex in Church Crookham, empty since July 2017, was demolished to make way for a retail park.

See also
Goldvish
Gresso
Bellperre International

References

Companies based in Hampshire
Electronics companies of the United Kingdom
Mobile phone manufacturers
Nokia mobile phones
Hart District
British brands
Luxury brands
Manufacturing companies of England
Electronics companies established in 1998
Retail companies established in 1998
Shops in New York City